Hansi He Hansi...Mil Toh Lein is an Indian comedy drama television series which aired on SAB TV. The series was produced by Contiloe Entertainment.The show which premiered on 12 April 2015.

Cast
Gaurav Gera
Suresh Menon
Sukesh Anand
Kunal Kumar
Rajeev Chawla
Sudeepa Singh 
Navina Bole
Shah Faisal Saifi

References

2015 Indian television series debuts
Hindi-language television shows
Television shows set in Mumbai
Sony SAB original programming